The Battle of Point Pedro was a naval battle that occurred on May 12, 2006 near Point Pedro, Jaffna, Sri Lanka. The Sri Lankan Navy was attacked by a group of Tamil Tiger boats. A group of SLN attack boats was escorting a troop transport, the MV Pearl Cruise II which was carrying 710 soldiers for the city of Jaffna which had been under siege for the previous six years.

About 15 Sea Tiger boats, including suicide boats, were engaged in the battle. One navy patrol boat P-148 and five Tiger boats were sunk. P-148 under the command of Lieutenant Commander Lalith Edirisinghe spotted the incoming rebels and recognized the bullets his crew was firing, to be ricocheting off the suicide craft. Upon seeing no other way to stop the craft, Edirisinghe sped towards the LTTE suicide craft and rammed it, causing the explosion to destroy both vessels, protecting the transport. Lieutenant Commander Edirisinghe including 16 other sailors were killed in action, while the LTTE had reported 54 of their own killed. Following the failed explosion, the LTTE boats retreated, repelling the attack .

References

Point Pedro
Point Pedro 2006
Point Pedro
2006 in Sri Lanka
May 2006 events in Asia